Achi (Achí in Spanish) is a Mayan language very closely related to Kʼicheʼ (Quiché in the older orthography). It is spoken by the Achi people, primarily in the department of Baja Verapaz in Guatemala.

There are two Achi dialects. Rabinal Achi is spoken in the Rabinal area, and Cubulco Achi is spoken in the Cubulco area west of Rabinal.

One of the masterpieces of precolumbian literature is the Rabinal Achí, a theatrical play written in the Achi language.

Phonology

Consonants 

 Voiceless plosives can have aspirated allophones , either when preceding a consonant or in word-final position.
 A pharyngeal fricative sound  can be heard before vowels or in word-initial or intervocalic environments preceding vowels.
 A uvular consonant  can also be heard as velar  in some environments.  when preceding a velar consonant can be heard as a velar nasal .
 Sonorants  when preceding a voiceless consonant or in word-final position can occur sounding voiceless .

Vowels

Orthography
Achi uses a Latin-based alphabet:

References

External links
Collections in the Archive of the Indigenous Languages of Latin America
Pronouncing the Maya Achi Alphabet
New Testament in Achi
OLAC resources in and about the Achi language
 Listen to a sample of Achi from Global Recordings Network

Agglutinative languages
Mayan languages
Indigenous languages of Central America
Mesoamerican languages
Languages of Guatemala
Baja Verapaz Department